Rose Marcario is the former CEO of outdoor apparel company Patagonia. She currently serves on the board of trustees at Naropa University.

Biography 
Rose Marcario earned a BS in Business and Finance from the University of Albany and an MBA at California State University, Los Angeles. She then spent 15 years in private equity. 

Rose Marcario joined Patagonia in 2008 as CFO. Marcario has been a vocal supporter of on-site child care, which Patagonia established in 1983. Under her leadership, 100 percent of the company's working mothers have returned to work after giving birth. On June 1, 2017, Marcario opened an on-site child care facility at Patagonia's distribution center in Reno, Nevada. Marcario believes that employer-operated child care facilities are the answer to getting more women on company boards and in CEO positions.

On June 10, 2020, Marcario announced she was stepping down as president and chief executive officer of Patagonia, effective June 12, 2020. She was included in the 2021 and 2022 Fast Company Queer 50 lists.

Politics 
In February 2016, Marcario and Patagonia founder Yvon Chouinard made a public statement about the company's commitment to public lands by choosing to withdraw the company's participation from the annual Outdoor Retailer trade show. The show was hosted in Salt Lake City, Utah, and Marcario and Chouinard said they were protesting Utah Governor Gary Herbert's attempts to rescind the Bears Ears National Monument. Marcario's decision to use the company's participation in Outdoor Retailer as a bargaining tool to change Herbert's stance on public lands spurred a boycott of the trade show. Marcario and Patagonia said the brand would boycott the show, one of Salt Lake City's most profitable annual conventions, unless the state's elected officials backed down on their efforts to rescind Bears Ears. Many other companies said they, too, would boycott the show in solidarity with Patagonia, which caused Outdoor Retailer and the Outdoor Industry Association to seek a new home for the show in a state deemed more friendly to public lands.

Patagonia has sought to mobilize its customers over Trump's executive order to reduce some national monuments, particularly Bears Ears National Monument, and has sued the Trump administration over the matter.

Marcario closed Patagonia's doors on Election Day in 2016 to raise awareness about the importance of voting. Four days after the inauguration of President Donald Trump, she spoke out against the Trump administration in defense of public lands and the fight against climate change.

References 

Year of birth missing (living people)
Living people
University at Albany, SUNY alumni
California State University, Los Angeles alumni
American women in business
American chief executives of manufacturing companies
21st-century American women